Marangaluy-e Bozorg (also Romanized as Marangalūy-e Bozorg; also known as Marangalū-ye Bozorg) is a village in Nazlu-e Shomali Rural District, Nazlu District, Urmia County, West Azerbaijan Province, Iran. At the 2006 census, its population was 478, in 139 families.

References 

Populated places in Urmia County